Richard David Gill (born 11 September 1951) is a mathematician born in the United Kingdom who has lived in the Netherlands since 1974. As a probability theorist and statistician, Gill is most well known for his research on counting processes and survival analysis, some of which has appeared in an advanced textbook. Now retired, he was the chair of mathematical statistics at Leiden University. Gill is also known for his pro bono consulting and advocacy on behalf of victims of incompetent statistical testimony, including a Dutch nurse who was wrongfully convicted and jailed for six years.

Biography
He studied mathematics at the University of Cambridge (1970–1973), and subsequently followed the Diploma of Statistics course there (1973–1974).

Marrying a Dutch woman, he moved to the Netherlands where he worked from 1974 to 1988 at the Mathematical Centre (later renamed Centrum Wiskunde & Informatica, or CWI) of Amsterdam. In 1979, Gill obtained his PhD with the thesis Censoring and Stochastic Integrals, which was supervised by Jacobus Oosterhoff  of the Vrije Universiteit, which awarded the doctorate. Gill spent Autumn 1980 at the Statistical Research Unit at the University of Copenhagen. Gill continued to collaborate with Danish (and Norwegian) statisticians for ten years, helping to write the book Statistical models based on counting processes, which is often referred to as "ABGK" (for the authors Andersen, Borgan, Gill, and Keiding). In 1983 he became the head of the Department of Mathematical Statistics at CWI.

In 1988 he moved to the Department of Mathematics of Utrecht University. Gill became the chair in mathematical stochastics—this chair represented the three mathematical sciences of mathematical statistics, probability theory, and operations research. His PhD students include Sara van de Geer and Mark van der Laan.

In 2006, he moved to the Department of Mathematics at Leiden University, where he became the chair of mathematical statistics. Since then, he has conducted statistical research in the theory of quantum information, forensic statistics, scientific integrity and in biostatistics. He has also worked on survival analysis, semiparametric models, causality, missing data, machine learning, and statistics in image analysis. Gill also publishes on the foundations of several mathematical sciences: the foundations of statistics, of probability, of mathematics, and of quantum physics. He reached the mandatory retirement age in 2017, and continues with research and consultancy.

Statistical advocacy against wrongful convictions

In recent years he has lobbied for retrials for Lucia de Berk, Kevin Sweeney and Benjamin Geen. The nurse Lucia de Berk was sentenced to life imprisonment, after a legal psychologist gave testimony that there was great likelihood that de Berk committed a string of murders.
The court was told by Dr Henk Elffers of the Netherlands Institute for the Study of Crime and Law Enforcement that more children had died on her shifts than appeared possible by chance. He put the odds of her presence being a mere coincidence at one in 342 million, a figure that seemed to have blinded the court to any alternative explanation of the deaths.

This statistical testimony was shown to be fallacious by professional statisticians, notably Gill. Continued scrutiny showed that the data had also been collected to support the prosecutor's conviction of Berk, which further invalidated the pseudo-statistical testimony.
The conduct of the case, in Professor Gill's account, was extraordinary.   Convinced she was guilty, the police and the managers of the Juliana Children's Hospital assembled a dossier in which it seemed every death became unnatural when it had occurred during, or after, a shift in which she had worked. For one of the alleged murders, it was established on appeal she had not even been in the hospital for three days around the time it occurred.   Using more appropriate statistical methods reduced the odds from one in 342 million to one in 48. A further analysis by Professor Gill further reduces the odds to one in nine.
Professor Gill helped in the campaign to have a new trial. Consequently, a retrial was ordered, and de Berk was found not guilty, and received a public apology from the Dutch government, along with financial compensation (amount unknown) for her six years of incarceration.

Honors
Richard Gill is a member of the Royal Netherlands Academy of Arts and Sciences. He is a past president of The Netherlands Society for Statistics and Operations Research, which publishes the journal Statistica Neerlandica. Gill was selected as the 2010–2011 Distinguished Lorentz Fellow by the Netherlands Institute for Advanced Study in Humanities and Social Sciences.

References

External links
 Richard Gill's homepage at Leiden University.
 

1951 births
Living people
20th-century Dutch mathematicians
21st-century Dutch mathematicians

British emigrants to the Netherlands

Academic staff of Utrecht University
Members of the Royal Netherlands Academy of Arts and Sciences
Dutch statisticians
Probability theorists
Dutch operations researchers
Academic staff of Leiden University
Alumni of the University of Cambridge
People from Redhill, Surrey
British operations researchers
Wrongful conviction advocacy
Vrije Universiteit Amsterdam alumni
Mathematical statisticians